Tom Hanson is an actor and director.

Filmography

Director
 The Zodiac Killer (1971)
 A Ton of Grass Goes to Pot (1972)

Actor
 Night Train To Mundo Fine (1966)
 The Hellcats (1967)
 The Zodiac Killer (1971)

References

External links

Year of birth missing
Possibly living people
American male film actors
American film directors